Yaku (याकु) is a village development committee in Bhojpur District in the Kosi Zone of eastern Nepal. It is inhabited mainly by Dhakal (श्रेष्ठ); a few other castes are found. Yaku is also known to be birta of the shresthas. It is a remote place and it has produced a number of well-known figures in Nepal, including academicians, bureaucrats and politicians.

At the time of the 1991 Nepal census it had a population of 3086 persons living in 537 individual households.

References

External links
UN map of the municipalities of Bhojpur District

Populated places in Bhojpur District, Nepal